The Blue House is the former executive office and official residence of the President of South Korea.

Blue House may also refer to:

 Blue House (album), a 1994 blues album by Marcia Ball
 Blue House (Hong Kong), a tenement block
 Blue House, Frome, a Grade 1 listed building in Somerset, England
 Frida Kahlo Museum in Mexico, also known as "The Blue House"

See also
 Blue Palace
 House of Blues
 John Blue House (disambiguation)
 Blue House Raid, an attempted assassination of the President of South Korea in 1968